Henry Thomas Colebrooke FRS FRSE FLS (15 June 1765 – 10 March 1837) was an English orientalist and mathematician. He has been described as "the first great Sanskrit scholar in Europe".

Biography
Henry Thomas Colebrooke was born on 15 June 1765. His parents were Sir George Colebrooke, 2nd Baronet, MP for Arundel and Chairman of the East India Company from 1769, and Mary Gaynor, daughter and heir of Patrick Gaynor of Antigua. He was educated at home.

In 1782 Colebrooke was appointed through his father's influence to a writership with the East India Company in Calcutta. In 1786 and three years later he was appointed assistant collector in the revenue department at Tirhut. He wrote Remarks on the Husbandry and Commerce of Bengal, which was privately published in 1795, by which time he had transferred to Purnia. This opposed the East India Company's monopoly on Indian trade, advocating instead for free trade between Britain and India, which caused offence to the East India Company's governors.

He was appointed to the magistracy of Mirzapur in 1795 and was sent to Nagpur in 1799 to negotiate an allowance with the Raja of Berar. He was unsuccessful in this, due to events elsewhere, and returned in 1801.
On his return was made a judge of the new court of appeal in Calcutta, of which he became president of the bench in 1805. Also in 1805, Lord Wellesley appointed him honorary professor of Hindu law and Sanskrit at the college of Fort William. In 1807 he became a member of council, serving for five years, and was elected President of the Asiatic Society of Calcutta. Colebrooke married Elizabeth Wilkinson in 1810. The marriage was short-lived and she died in 1814. He returned to England in 1815.

In 1816 he was elected to the fellowship of both the Royal Society and the Royal Society of Edinburgh In 1820 he was a founder of the Royal Astronomical Society. He often chaired the society's meetings in the absence of the first president, William Herschel, and was elected as its second president on Herschel's death, serving 1823–1825. In 1823 he was also a founder of the Royal Asiatic Society, chairing its first meeting although he declined to become its president.

Works
After eleven years' residence in India, Colebrooke began the study of the Sanskrit language; and to him was entrusted the translation of the major Digest of Hindu Laws, a monumental study of Hindu law which had been left unfinished by Sir William Jones. He translated the two treatises, the Mitacshara of Vijnaneshwara and the Dayabhaga of Jimutavahana, under the title Law of Inheritance. During his residence at Calcutta he wrote his Sanskrit Grammar (1805), some papers on the religious ceremonies of the Hindus, and his Essay on the Vedas (1805), for a long time the standard work in English on the subject. A posthumous essay on his father's life was published by Sir T. E. Colebrooke in 1873 as part of a reprinting of Miscellaneous Essays.

He collected plants in the Sylhet Division and sent plants and drawings to William Jackson Hooker and Aylmer Bourke Lambert. Colebrooke's botanical specimens are stored at Kew Gardens.

Indological
 
 
  (by Amara Singh; with an English interpretation and annotations by H.T. Colebrooke)

Botanical

 
 
  (with William Jack)

References

Further reading
 Buckland, C. E., ed. (1906). "Colebrooke, Henry Thomas" in Dictionary of Indian Biography.  London: Swan Sonnenschein & Company. Pp. 87–88. Also available online at: "Colebrooke, Henry Thomas", archive.org. 
 Colebrooke, Thomas E. (1873). "Life of Colebrooke" in Frederick Max Müller's Chips from a German Workshop, (1875). Vol. IV, pp. 377–317. London: Longmans, Green & Company. Also available here in reprint edition (1881): "Life of Colebrooke", archive.org.
 Higgenbothom, J. J. (1874). "Colebrooke, Henry Thomas" in Men Whom India Has Known: Biographies of Eminent Indian Characters. Madras: Higgenbothom & Company. Pp. 75–79. Also available online: "Colebrooke, Henry Thomas", archive.org.
 Rocher, Rosane and Ludo (2011). The Making of Western Indology: Henry Thomas Colebrooke and the East India Company. London: Routledge for the Royal Asiatic Society. 

1765 births
1837 deaths
British Indologists
Hindu law
British historians of mathematics
Sanskrit–English translators
Younger sons of baronets
Fellows of the Royal Society
Fellows of the Royal Society of Edinburgh
Fellows of the Linnean Society of London
Honorary members of the Saint Petersburg Academy of Sciences
Translators of the Bible into Persian
Presidents of the Royal Astronomical Society
Presidents of The Asiatic Society
Henry